Baccharis angustifolia (most commonly known as saltwater false willow or just false willow) is a species of North American plants in the family Asteraceae. It is native to the Southeastern United States from Louisiana to North Carolina.

It is found on streambanks, in hammocks, and on coastal sand dunes.

References

External links
Pollen Library
Atlas of Florida Vascular Plants
Discover Life, Baccharis angustifolia Michx., saltwater false willow
Alabama Plant Atlas

angustifolia
Flora of the Southeastern United States
Plants described in 1803
Flora without expected TNC conservation status